William, Bill or Billy Bradshaw may refer to:

William Bradshaw (Puritan) (1571–1618), English Puritan
William Bradshaw (MP), Welsh politician who sat in the House of Commons from 1604 to 1611
William Bradshaw (writer) ( 1700), British hack writer
William Bradshaw (bishop) (1671–1732), bishop of Bristol
William Bradshaw (cabinetmaker), 18th century British cabinet-maker
William Bradshaw (VC) (1830–1861), Irish recipient of the Victoria Cross
William D. Bradshaw (1826–1864), United States western pioneer
William R. Bradshaw (1851–1927), American writer 
William Bradshaw (footballer) (1882–?), English footballer with Arsenal, Fulham, Burton United & Burnley
William Bradshaw, Baron Bradshaw (born 1936), British academic and politician
William Bradshaw (British Army officer) (1897–1966)
Billy Bradshaw (footballer) (1884–?), England international footballer, who played for Blackburn Rovers
Bill Bradshaw (rugby league) (died 2017), rugby league footballer of the 1940s
Billy Bradshaw, a fictional character, in The Bradshaws family